Guardavalle is a comune and town in the province of Catanzaro in the Calabria region of Italy.

References

External links
 Official website

Cities and towns in Calabria